Bothus is a genus of flatfish in the family Bothidae (lefteye flounders) from the Pacific, Indian and Atlantic Oceans. Some species in this genus have spots consisting of blue rings.

Species
There are currently 16 recognized species in this genus:
 Bothus assimilis (Günther, 1862)
 Bothus constellatus (D. S. Jordan, 1889) (Pacific eyed flounder)
 Bothus ellipticus (Poey, 1860)
 Bothus guibei Stauch, 1966 (Guinean flounder)
 Bothus leopardinus (Günther, 1862) (Pacific leopard flounder)
 Bothus lunatus (Linnaeus, 1758) (Plate fish)
 Bothus maculiferus (Poey, 1860) (Mottled flounder)
 Bothus mancus (Broussonet, 1782) (Flowery flounder)
 Bothus mellissi Norman, 1931 (St. Helena flounder)
 Bothus myriaster (Temminck & Schlegel, 1846) (Indo-Pacific oval flounder)
 Bothus ocellatus (Agassiz, 1831) (Eyed flounder)
 Bothus pantherinus (Rüppell, 1830) (Leopard flounder)
 Bothus podas (Delaroche, 1809) (Wide-eyed flounder)
 Bothus robinsi Topp & F. H. Hoff, 1972 (Twospot flounder)
 Bothus swio Hensley, 1997
 Bothus tricirrhitus Kotthaus, 1977

References
 

Bothidae
Marine fish genera
Taxa named by Constantine Samuel Rafinesque